Harry Duffield Stovey (né Stowe; December 20, 1856 – September 20, 1937) was a 19th-century Major League Baseball player and the first player in major league history to hit 100 home runs. Born in Philadelphia, Pennsylvania, Stovey played for fourteen seasons in the majors and was appointed player-manager on two separate occasions during his career.

He stole 509 bases in his career, which is tied for 35th all-time; among players who played in fifteen seasons or less, he ranks sixth. Stovey finished in the top ten in home runs eleven times (1880–1886, 1888–1991), which included time in three leagues; he led the league in home runs five times. He also finished in the top ten in runs scored ten times, batting average six times, and on-base percentage seven times. He was the first to wear sliding pads and among the first to slide feet first.

Baseball career

Philadelphia Defiance
In 1877, Harry began his career in the pitcher’s box and graduated out of the ranks of a Philadelphia amateur team called the Defiance (the Philadelphia Defiance were a professional team, part of the league Alliance).

New Bedford
In 1878, Frank Bancroft, owner/manager of the New Bedford Baseball Club, engaged Stovey to join his pitching staff. When the New Bedfords' John Piggot, first baseman, became ill during their first exhibition game of the season, Stovey was asked to take over, and played brilliantly enough that he replaced Piggott as the starting first basemen for the entire season.

Worcester
He made an immediate impact that first season, leading the league with 14 triples and six home runs, while also finishing in the top ten in many other offensive categories. On July 17, he hit his first major league home run off Jim McCormick of the Cleveland Blues.

For the  season, his offensive numbers did not slow down, again finishing in the top ten in several offensive categories, though he did not lead the league in any this time around. On August 17, 1881, Worcester suspended Captain Mike Dorgan‚ and Stovey took over the position for the remainder of the season. Lee Richmond‚ who had quit because of conflicts with Dorgan‚ rejoined the team after this switch.

In , his last season for the Worcesters, his batting average saw an increase, up to .289 from .270 the year before, but his numbers in relation to the rest of the league took a slight dip. He ranked third in the league in runs scored, with 90, and fourth in the league in home runs, with five.

Philadelphia

For the  season, Stovey moved on to play for the Philadelphia Athletics of the American Association, and it was during the next seven years when he had his best years, and made his greatest impact on the game. That year, the Athletics won the league pennant, doing so with a record of 66–32 that beat St. Louis by one game. Stovey kept this record for only one season, as Ned Williamson set a new mark the very next season with 27. Not only did he set the home run record, he batted .306, and led the league in runs scored with 110, doubles with 31, and games played with 112, while also finishing in the top five in most offensive categories. It was also the first of nine straight seasons where he collected 200+ total bases and 100+ runs scored.

The offensive explosiveness continued throughout his stay in Philadelphia, leading the league in runs scored four times, doubles once, triples three times, and home runs three times. The accumulation of home runs led to him becoming the career home run leader, overtaking Charley Jones with his 51st career homer on September 28, . That year, he led the league with 68 stolen bases.

Boston
In , the Players' League, a rival league to the National League and the American Association, began, and it attracted many of the game's star players, including Stovey who "jumped" to the Boston Reds. He had a good season, batting .299, hit eleven triples, and twelve home runs while having 97 stolen bases.  On September 3, 1890, Stovey became the first player to hit 100 homers for a career, off of Jersey Bakley in a game against Cleveland, a significant milestone in a day when home runs were relatively rare. The Reds won the league pennant with a record of 81–48 (6½ games over Brooklyn) to garner Stovey's second league championship.

After the 1890 season, the Players' League folded with many of the players returning to their former ballclubs. Stovey‚ who played with the Athletics in 1889, was not claimed by that club through a clerical error, so on February 5, 1891, he signed with the Boston Beaneaters of the National League. In 134 games, he led the league that season with sixteen home runs and twenty triples, while also hitting .279 with 31 doubles as well. It proved to be last great season of his career.

Baltimore / Brooklyn
He finished the season with a .272 batting average with the Orioles and hit eleven triples, including three in one game on July 21 in a 10–3 victory over the Pittsburgh Pirates. In a total of 112 games, he batted .235/.326/.371 with 101 hits and 67 RBIs.

The  season was Stovey's last season in the majors, playing 56 total games. He was released by the Orioles on May 22 after only eight games, and was signed three days later on May 15 by the Brooklyn Grooms. He finished the season with Grooms and retired after the season was over.

Career statistics
In 1,489 games over fourteen seasons, Stovey posted a .288 batting average (1,775-for-6,153) with 1,495 runs, 348 doubles, 176 triples, 122 home runs, 912 RBI, 509 stolen bases, and 664 bases on balls. He finished his career with a .943 fielding percentage playing the outfield and first base.

Post-career
After his career, Stovey returned to New Bedford, Massachusetts where he had begun his baseball career, in order to manage the local amateur team in 1893. He subsequently worked as a police officer in the city. Stovey died at the age of 80 in New Bedford, and is interred at Oak Grove Cemetery.

The Nineteenth Century Committee of the Society for American Baseball Research named Stovey the Overlooked 19th Century Baseball Legend for 2011 — a 19th-century player, manager, executive or other baseball personality not yet inducted into the National Baseball Hall of Fame in Cooperstown, New York.

See also

 List of Major League Baseball career runs scored leaders
 List of Major League Baseball career triples leaders
 List of Major League Baseball career stolen bases leaders
 List of Major League Baseball annual home run leaders
 List of Major League Baseball annual runs batted in leaders
 List of Major League Baseball annual runs scored leaders
 List of Major League Baseball annual doubles leaders
 List of Major League Baseball annual triples leaders
 List of Major League Baseball players to hit for the cycle
 List of Major League Baseball player-managers

References

External links

 

 Harry Stovey at SABR (Baseball BioProject)

1856 births
1937 deaths
19th-century baseball players
Major League Baseball outfielders
Major League Baseball first basemen
Major League Baseball player-managers
National League home run champions
Worcester Ruby Legs players
Worcester Worcesters managers
Philadelphia Athletics (AA) players
Philadelphia Athletics (AA) managers
Boston Reds (PL) players
Boston Beaneaters players
Brooklyn Grooms players
Philadelphia Defiance players
Philadelphia Athletic players
New Bedford (minor league baseball) players
New Haven (minor league baseball) players
Hartford (minor league baseball) players
Baseball players from Philadelphia
Baseball coaches from Pennsylvania
American municipal police officers